The Beneteau First 25S is a French sailboat, that was designed by Group Finot/Conq and first built in 2008.

The First 25S is a development of the Beneteau First 260 Spirit and the Beneteau First 25.7.

Production
The design is built by Beneteau in France and in the United States. It remained in production in 2018 as the First 25.

Design

The First 25S is a recreational keelboat, built predominantly of fiberglass, with wood trim. It has a fractional sloop rig with a square-head mainsail, a plumb stem, a vertical transom, dual transom-hung rudders controlled by a tiller and a centreboard or optional fixed fin keel. It displaces  and carries  of ballast.

Operational history
In a 2017 review in Sail magazine, writer Zuzana Prochazka concluded, "Beneteau’s marketing material describes the boat as being built for 'spontaneous day-cruising,' but it's clear there is enough performance in this design for the boat to get in some fun and exciting club racing as well. Equally appealing is the idea that you can trailer the First 25 S pretty much anywhere, launch it and go exploring to your heart's content. In short, this is one nice little boat."

See also
List of sailing boat types

Related development
Beneteau First 25.7
Beneteau First 260 Spirit

Similar sailboats
Bayfield 25
C&C 25
Cal 25
Capri 25
Catalina 25
Catalina 250
Jouët 760
Kelt 7.6
Kirby 25
MacGregor 25
O'Day 25
Redline 25
Tanzer 25
US Yachts US 25

References

External links

Keelboats
2000s sailboat type designs
Sailing yachts
Sailboat type designs by Groupe Finot
Sailboat types built by Beneteau